Henrik Ohlmeyer (born 11 February 1946) is a German ski jumper. He competed in the normal hill and large hill events at the 1968 Winter Olympics.

References

External links
 

1946 births
Living people
German male ski jumpers
Olympic ski jumpers of West Germany
Ski jumpers at the 1968 Winter Olympics
People from Bayreuth (district)
Sportspeople from Upper Franconia